Romans 11 is the eleventh chapter of the Epistle to the Romans in the New Testament of the Christian Bible. It is authored by Paul the Apostle, while he was in Corinth in the mid-50s AD, with the help of an amanuensis (secretary), Tertius, who adds his own greeting in Romans 16:22.

Chapter 11 concludes the section of the letter in which "St. Paul teaches us about the eternal providence of God" with particular reference to the election of a chosen people, Israel (Romans 9:11), who have become disobedient (Romans 11:31), and in whose place a remnant have been chosen (Romans 11:5)  and grafted into place.

Text

The original text was written in Koine Greek. This chapter is divided into 36 verses.

Textual witnesses
Some early manuscripts containing the text of this chapter are:
 In Greek:
 Codex Vaticanus (AD 325–350)
 Codex Sinaiticus (330–360)
 Codex Alexandrinus (400–440)
 Codex Ephraemi Rescriptus (extant verses 1–14)
 in Gothic language
 Codex Carolinus (6th/7th century; extant verses 33–36)
 in Latin
 Codex Carolinus (6th/7th century; extant verses 33–36)

Old Testament references
 Romans 11:1–2 references Psalm 94:14
 Romans 11:3 references 1 Kings 19:10,14
 Romans 11:4 references 1 Kings 19:18
 Romans 11:8 references Deuteronomy 29:4 and Isaiah 29:10
 Romans 11:9–10 references Psalm 69:22, 23
 Romans 11:27 references Isaiah 59:20, 21
 Romans 11:34 references Isaiah 40:13 and Jeremiah 23:18
 Romans 11:35 references Job 41:11

New Testament references
 Romans 11:1 references Philippians 3:5

Paul's identity

Verse 1

Paul uses the phrase "Certainly not!" or *God forbid" regularly in this letter. On this occasion, he puts himself forward as an example to evidence his argument, "to show that God has not rejected His people en masse. An Israelite of pure descent, he is, nevertheless a true believer". Later in the chapter (Romans 11:13), Paul also refers to himself as the "apostle of the gentiles".

Verse 34 

Romans 34 cites both Isaiah 40:13 and Jeremiah 23:18.

See also
 Abraham
 Baal
 Benjamin
 David
 Elijah
 Israel
 Zion
 Other related Bible parts: Deuteronomy 29, 1 Kings 19, Job 41, Psalm 69, Isaiah 40, Isaiah 59, Jeremiah 23

Notes

References

Bibliography

External links
  King James Bible – Wikisource
 English Translation with Parallel Latin Vulgate
 Online Bible at GospelHall.org (ESV, KJV, Darby, American Standard Version, Bible in Basic English)
 Multiple bible versions at Bible Gateway (NKJV, NIV, NRSV etc.)

 
11